Yemenis or Yemenites are the nationals of Yemen.

Social hierarchy
There is a system of social stratification in Yemen that was officially abolished at the creation of the Republic of Yemen in 1962 but, in practice, this system has not disappeared and Yemeni society is still organized around hierarchical ranks. The difference between ranks is manifested by descent and occupation and is consolidated by marriages between people of the same ranks.

There are five status groups. At the top of hierarchy, there are the religious elites, also called sada. These are then followed by the strata of judges (quad). The third hierarchical status is the qaba’il, who are the peasants who belong to tribes and who live mainly from agriculture and trading. The fourth group is called the mazayanah. This group is composed of people who had no land and provide different kinds of services such as butchers and craftsmen. Finally, at the bottom of the hierarchy are the slaves (a’bid) and even further below them Al-Akhdam, which means servants.

Diaspora

The Yemeni diaspora is largely concentrated in the United Kingdom, where between 70,000 and 80,000 Yemenis live. Over 20,000 Yemenis reside in the United States, and an additional 2,812 live in Italy. Other Yemenis also reside in Saudi Arabia, the United Arab Emirates, Qatar and Bahrain, as well as Indonesia, Malaysia, Brunei, Madagascar and the former USSR. A smaller number of modern-day Pakistanis are of Yemeni descent, their original ancestors having left Yemen for the Indian subcontinent and Southeast Asia over four centuries ago. 350,000 Yemenite Jews live in Israel. In 2015, due to the conflict in Yemen, many have migrated to the northern coasts of Djibouti, Madagascar and Somalia.

Notable Yemenis

 Tawakkol Karman, Yemeni Nobel Laureate, journalist, politician, and human rights activist
 Anwar al-Awlaki, Yemeni-American imam
 Ali al-Jifri,  Yemeni-born Islamic scholar
 Shoshana Damari, Yemeni-Israeli singer
 Ofra Haza, Yemeni-Israeli singer

References and notes

Ethnic groups in the Middle East
Ethnic groups in Yemen
Arabs